{{DISPLAYTITLE:C16H21N}}
The molecular formula C16H21N (molar mass: 227.34 g/mol, exact mass: 227.1674 u) may refer to:

 Hasubanan
 Morphinan